November 28 - Eastern Orthodox liturgical calendar - November 30

All fixed commemorations below are observed on December 12 by Eastern Orthodox Churches on the Old Calendar.

For November 29, Orthodox Churches on the Old Calendar commemorate the Saints listed on November 16.

Saints

 Venerable Nicholas, Archbishop of Thessaloniki (c. 160)
 Hieromartyr Dionysius, Bishop of Corinth (182)
 Martyrs Paramon and 370 others, at Bithynia (250)
 Martyr Philoumenos of Ancyra(274), and with him:
 Martyr Valerian, by the sword (274)
 Martyr Phaedrus, by pouring hot resin over him (274)
 Hieromartyr John, in Persia (4th century)
 Holy 6 Martyrs.
 Venerable Pitirim of Egypt (4th century), disciple of St. Anthony the Great.
 Saint Tiridates, King of Armenia (4th century)
 Saint Acacius of Sinai (6th century), mentioned by John of the Ladder. (see also: November 26)
 Hieromartyr Abibus, Bishop of Nekresi, Georgia (6th century)
 Bishop Urban of Macedonia.
 Venerable Pankosmios.
 Venerable Mark.

Pre-Schism Western saints

 Hieromartyr Saturninus, venerated as the first Bishop of Toulouse (c. 257)
 Saint Blaise and Demetrius, martyrs in Veroli in central Italy.
 Hieromartyrs Saturninus and Sisinius (c. 309)
 Saint Illuminata, a virgin in Todi in Italy (c. 320)
 Saint Brendan of Birr (571)
 Saint Sadwrn (Sadwen), hermit, brother of St Illtyd and disciple of St Cadfan (6th century)
 Saint Hardoin, Bishop of St Pol-de-Léon in Brittany (7th century)
 Saint Æthelwine of Athelney (Egelwine, Aylwine), a prince of the house of Wessex who lived as a hermit at Athelney in Somerset, England (7th century)
 Saint Walderic, founder of the monastery of Murrhardt in Germany (c. 817)
 Saint Radboud of Utrecht, Bishop of Utrecht (917)
 Saint Gulstan (Gustan, Constans), a monk at St Gildas of Rhuys in Brittany (c. 1010)

Post-Schism Orthodox saints

 Saint Nectarius the Obedient, of the Kiev Caves (12th century)
 Saint Mardarije (Uskokovich) of Libertyville, Illinois, Enlightener and Apostle of the Church in America (1935)

New martyrs and confessors

 New Hieromartyr Sergius Kochurov, Priest (1941)
 New Hieromartyr Philoumenos (Hasapis) of Jacob's Well (1979)  (NS only for OS see: November 16 )
Martyr Momčilo Grgurević, Priest (1945)

Other commemorations

 Consecration of the Church of the Holy Martyrs Sergius and Bacchus.
 Repose of Blessed Abel "the Prophet", of Valaam Monastery (1831)

Icon gallery

Notes

References

Sources
 November 29 / December 12. Orthodox Calendar (PRAVOSLAVIE.RU).
 December 12 / November 29. Holy Trinity Russian Orthodox Church (A parish of the Patriarchate of Moscow).
 November 29. OCA - The Lives of the Saints.
 The Autonomous Orthodox Metropolia of Western Europe and the Americas (ROCOR). St. Hilarion Calendar of Saints for the year of our Lord 2004. St. Hilarion Press (Austin, TX). p. 89.
 The Twenty-Ninth Day of the Month of November. Orthodoxy in China.
 November 29. Latin Saints of the Orthodox Patriarchate of Rome.
 The Roman Martyrology. Transl. by the Archbishop of Baltimore. Last Edition, According to the Copy Printed at Rome in 1914. Revised Edition, with the Imprimatur of His Eminence Cardinal Gibbons. Baltimore: John Murphy Company, 1916. p. 368.
 Rev. Richard Stanton. A Menology of England and Wales, or, Brief Memorials of the Ancient British and English Saints Arranged According to the Calendar, Together with the Martyrs of the 16th and 17th Centuries. London: Burns & Oates, 1892. pp. 569–572.
Greek Sources
 Great Synaxaristes:  29 ΝΟΕΜΒΡΙΟΥ. ΜΕΓΑΣ ΣΥΝΑΞΑΡΙΣΤΗΣ.
  Συναξαριστής. 29 Νοεμβρίου. ECCLESIA.GR. (H ΕΚΚΛΗΣΙΑ ΤΗΣ ΕΛΛΑΔΟΣ). 
Russian Sources
  12 декабря (29 ноября). Православная Энциклопедия под редакцией Патриарха Московского и всея Руси Кирилла (электронная версия). (Orthodox Encyclopedia - Pravenc.ru).
  29 ноября (ст.ст.) 12 декабря 2014 (нов. ст.). Русская Православная Церковь Отдел внешних церковных связей. (DECR).
  29 ноября по старому стилю / 12 декабря по новому стилю. Русская Православная Церковь - Православный церковный календарь на 2018 год.

November in the Eastern Orthodox calendar